Otionellidae is a family of bryozoans belonging to the order Cheilostomatida.

Genera:
 Helixotionella Cook & Chimonides, 1984
 Kausiaria Bock & Cook, 1998
 Otiochmella Zágoršek, 2003
 Otionella Canu & Bassler, 1917
 Otionellina Bock & Cook, 1998
 Petasosella Bock & Cook, 1998

References

Cheilostomatida